The First National Bank of Punta Gorda (also known as the Old Merchants Bank of Punta Gorda) was a bank headquartered in  Punta Gorda, Florida. In 1985, it was acquired by First Florida Bank, which became part of Bank of America in 1999.

On March 14, 1991, its branch location was added to the National Register of Historic Places.

References

Punta Gorda, Florida
National Register of Historic Places in Charlotte County, Florida
Bank buildings on the National Register of Historic Places in Florida
Defunct banks of the United States
Banks established in 1800
1985 disestablishments in Florida
Banks disestablished in 1985
1800 establishments in North America